Stottesdon is a civil parish in Shropshire, England.  It contains 21 listed buildings that are recorded in the National Heritage List for England.  Of these, one is listed at Grade I, the highest of the three grades, one is at Grade II*, the middle grade, and the others are at Grade II, the lowest grade.  The parish contains the village of Stottesdon and other small settlements, and is otherwise rural.  The most important listed building in the parish is St Mary's Church, which incorporates Saxon material.  Most of the other listed buildings are farmhouses, farm buildings and houses, mainly dating from the 15th to the 17th century, a high proportion of which are timber framed.  The other listed buildings are a bridge, which is also a scheduled monument, and a 19th-century Methodist chapel.


Key

Buildings

References

Citations

Sources

Lists of buildings and structures in Shropshire